Weizhou or Wei Prefecture was a zhou (prefecture) in imperial China centering on modern Pingliang, Gansu, China. It existed (intermittently) from 809 until the 12th century when the Jin dynasty conquered the area from the Song dynasty.

Google
The administrative region of Wei Prefecture in the Song dynasty is in modern eastern Gansu on the border with southern Ningxia. It probably includes parts of modern: 
Under the administration of Pingliang, Gansu:
Pingliang
Huating County
Chongxin County
Under the administration of Guyuan, Ningxia:
Jingyuan

See other

References
 

Prefectures of the Tang dynasty
Prefectures of Later Tang
Prefectures of Later Zhou
Prefectures of Later Jin (Five Dynasties)
Prefectures of Qi (Five Dynasties)
Prefectures of Later Han (Five Dynasties)
Prefectures of the Song dynasty
Former prefectures in Gansu
Former prefectures in Ningxia